Suutei tsai, is a traditional Mongolian beverage.

The drink is also known as süütei tsai, tsutai tsai, or Mongolian salty tea.

Preparation
The ingredients to suutei tsai are typically water, milk, tea leaves and salt. A simple recipe might call for one quart of water, one quart of milk, a tablespoon of green tea, and one teaspoon of salt. But the ingredients often vary. Some recipes use green tea while others use black tea. Some recipes even include butter or fat. Milk in Mongolia is typically fresh, whole milk, and using half milk and half cream instead of only processed milk produces a rich beverage close to the authentic.  The amount of salt in the tea is also often varied. Another common addition to suutei tsai is fried millet.

The way of preparing the drink can also vary. The traditional way of cooking it includes stirring it by scooping it up while it is boiling and pouring it back in from a height. However, many today omit this step.

The tea that the Mongolians use for suutei tsai commonly comes from a block. The block consists of a lower quality of tea that is made up of stems or inferior tea leaves and is compressed into a block that can be easily stored. When needed, the tea is chipped off and added to the suutei tsai.

History
Milk continues to be a very important part of the Mongolian diet. The milk that Mongolians drink comes from many sources including cattle, camels, horses, yaks, goats, and sheep, though milk from cattle is now the norm. An old tradition among many Mongols was to not drink water straight. This could have been a result of the Mongols' belief that water was sacred.

During the mid-thirteenth century, a Franciscan friar, William of Rubruck, set out to the Mongol Empire to make an account of the Mongols. In his account, Rubruck noted the Mongols' drinking habits with water, saying that the Mongols were "most careful not to drink pure water". In a land where juice and wine were not readily available, many Mongols opted to drink milk-based products like suutei tsai or airag (a type of milk alcohol made from fermented mares milk) instead of pure water.

Popularity
While many Mongolians enjoy suutei tsai, some foreigners have a hard time adjusting to its distinctive flavor. This is particularly because of the salt in the drink.

Suutei tsai is one of the most common drinks in Mongolia. It is often drunk at meals and throughout the day. It is usually served to guests when they arrive at a Mongolian home, known as a yurt or ger. Upon arriving, guests are usually served suutei tsai with a hospitality bowl filled with snacks. Suutei tsai can be drunk straight, with boortsog (Mongolian fried biscuit) or with dumplings.

In addition, suutei tsai is available in instant packet form.

See also
Mongolian cuisine
Butter tea
Kumis
Masala chai

References

External links 

 Short video about Suutei Tsai
 Recipe for Suutei Tsai and a video of traditional method of stirring it
 Information about Mongolian dairy and dairy products
 Information about weather in Mongolia

Mongolian cuisine
Buryat cuisine
Tuvan cuisine
Kalmyk cuisine
Altai cuisine
Blended tea
Milk tea
Turkish drinks